Below are listed the squad constitutions for every nation which presented a team to the roller hockey competition at the 1992 Summer Olympics. Along with the rosters are also displayed total statistics per player and some general competition statistics.

Angola

Argentina

Australia

Brazil

Germany

Italy

Japan

Netherlands
21

*
*
*
*
*
*
*

Portugal

Spain

Switzerland

United States

General statistics

Players
 Top scorers: 
  – 32
  – 24
  – 15 

 Shots:
  – 229
  – 153
  – 146

 Efficiency (% goals):
  – 30
  – 22 (5 goals)
  – 22 (5 goals)

Teams
 Top scorers:
  – 83
  – 78
  – 70

 Shots:
  – 729
  – 684
  – 582

 Efficiency (% goals):
  – 13
  – 11
  – 10

 Assists:
  – 30
  – 28
  – 21

 Steals:
  – 250
  – 226
  – 207

 Turnovers:
  – 261
  – 250
  – 239

 Fouls:
  – 364
  – 357
  – 334

Others
 Most goals in a match – 38 (Japan 0–38 Portugal)
 Most goals by a player in a match – 16 →  (Japan 0–38 Portugal)
 Most goals by a team in a match – 38 (Japan 0–38 Portugal)
 Biggest goal difference in a match – 38 (Japan 0–38 Portugal)

See also
 Roller hockey at the 1992 Summer Olympics - Preliminary round
 Roller hockey at the 1992 Summer Olympics - Semi-finals

References
 

Roller hockey at the 1992 Summer Olympics